Gunnedah  is a town in north-eastern New South Wales, Australia and is the seat of the Gunnedah Shire local government area.  In the  the town recorded a population of 9,726. Gunnedah is situated within the Liverpool Plains, a fertile agricultural region, with 80% of the surrounding shire area devoted to farming. The Namoi River flows west then north-west through the town providing water beneficial to agricultural operations in the area.

The Gunnedah area is a significant producer of cotton, coal, beef, lamb and pork, and cereal and oilseed grains. Gunnedah is also home to AgQuip, Australia's largest annual agricultural field day.

Gunnedah is located on the Oxley and Kamilaroi Highways providing convenient road links to much of the northern sector of the state including to the regional centre Tamworth,  distant. The town has a station on the Mungindi railway line and is served by the daily NSW TrainLink Xplorer passenger service to and from Sydney and Moree.

It claims the title "Koala Capital of World".

In recent years the local shire council has moved away from this promotional tagline and there are concerns over the health of the local koala population and the impacts of climate change and local mining developments on koala habitat.

History 
Gunnedah and the surrounding areas were originally inhabited by Aboriginal Australians speaking the Kamilaroi (Gamilaraay) language. The name of the town in Kamilaroi means "Place of White Stones". The area now occupied by the town was settled by European sheep farmers in 1833 or 1834. With settlement in the area focused on wool production, Gunnedah was initially known as 'The Woolshed' until taking its name from the local Indigenous people who called themselves the Gunn-e-darr, the most famous of whom was Cumbo Gunnerah.

Dorothea Mackellar wrote her famous poem My Country (popularly known as I Love a Sunburnt Country) about her family's farm near Gunnedah. This is remembered by the annual Dorothea Mackellar Poetry Awards for school students held in Gunnedah.

The town is the home town of supermodels Miranda Kerr and Erica Packer, as well as photographer, Dean West.

Coal was discovered on Black Jack Hill in 1877. By 1891, 6,000 tons of coal had been raised from shafts. In September 1957, the Government Railway took over the working of the line.

In early 2012, Gunnedah experienced a mining boom resulting in rental properties being leased by mining companies for up to $1,350 per week.

Heritage listings 
Gunnedah has a number of heritage-listed sites, including:
 Werris Creek-Moree railway: Gunnedah railway station
 Gunnedah Leather Processors

Population
According to the 2016 census of Population, there are 9,726 people in Gunnedah.
 Aboriginal and Torres Strait Islander people made up 13.7% of the population. 
 86.2% of people were born in Australia and 90.2% of people only spoke English at home. 
 The most common responses for religion were Anglican 28.8%, Catholic 27.3% and No Religion 20.3%.

Sports
The most popular sport in Gunnedah by a wide margin is Rugby league. The local team, the Gunnedah Bulldogs, play out of Kitchener Park. They compete in the Group 4 Rugby League competition, in which they have won seven premierships.

Other sports teams include the Gunnedah AFL Bulldogs and Gunnedah Red Devils RUFC.

Geography 
The climate is hot in summer, mild in winter and dry, although rainstorms in catchment areas occasionally cause flooding of the Namoi River. Major floods cut transport links to the town, briefly isolating it from the outside world. The town is located on a rich coal seam and within the northern New South Wales wheat belt.

The Gunnedah area is noted for its abundance of native wildlife, including kangaroos, echidnas and koalas. Koalas can often be found in trees within the town, as well as in the surrounding countryside with the help of signs placed by the local tourist centre.  The koala population is considered to be the largest koala colony in the state, west of the Great Dividing Range.

Climate
Gunnedah has a subtropical climate with temperatures regularly rising above 40 °C in summer and dropping below 0 °C in winter. This is due to the town's far inland location on the North West Slopes.

Snowfall is very rare, with the most recent occurrence in 1984.

Education 
Gunnedah has three secondary schools: Gunnedah High School, Carinya Christian school and St Mary's College. There are three government (Gunnedah Public School, Gunnedah South Public School, and G.S. Kidd Memorial School) and two non-government (St Xavier's Catholic School and Carinya Christian School) primary schools. A campus of the New England Institute of TAFE is also located within the town.

Media 
Local media include the Gunnedah Times and Namoi Valley Independent newspapers and the radio stations 2MO and 2GGG. The Namoi Valley Independent, published by Australian Community Media, switched to a digital-only newspaper model in 2020. The Gunnedah Times started as a print newspaper in November 2020 and is published by the Dunnet family, of Narrabri, who also publishes the bi-weekly The Courier newspaper in Narrabri. 2MO began broadcasting in 1930 and was only the fourth Radio Licence issued in Australia, being the first station established in Australia outside a capital city.

Transport
The Oxley Highway and the Kamilaroi Highway both pass through Gunnedah, for a short distance, concurrently. The Oxley Highway leads to Tamworth in the east and Coonabarabran to the west. The Kamilaroi Highway leads to Quirindi to the south-east and Boggabri to the north-west.

Railway station 
Gunnedah railway station is situated on the Mungindi (or North West) railway line,  from Sydney. The station, opened in 1879, consists of a substantial station building on a single side platform, a passing loop and small goods yard. There are also sidings serving an adjacent flour mill. To the west of the station there are extensive sidings serving grain silos and loop sidings serving coal loading facilities. For a brief three-year period after the railway arrived in Gunnedah it was the railhead until construction was completed to Boggabri and then to Narrabri South Junction in 1882. Currently a single daily Xplorer diesel railmotor operating between Sydney and Moree serves the station.

Notable Gunnedahians 

 Leanne Castley – Member of the ACT Legislative Assembly 
 Sara Carrigan – Olympic Gold Medallist
 Gordon Bray – Sports Commentator
 John "Dallas" Donnelly – rugby league player
 Tom Gleeson – Comedian
 Lindsay Johnston – rugby league player 
 Miranda Kerr – model
 Michael Kilborn – cricketer and cardiologist
 Dorothea Mackellar – poet
 Sam Naismith - Australian rules footballer
 John O'Neill – rugby league player
 Erica Packer – model and singer, ex-wife  of James Packer - Australian billionaire businessman and investor
 Angus Roberts – rugby union player
 Ben Smith – rugby league player
 Pat Studdy-Clift - author
 Ron Turner – rugby league player
 James Wynne – rugby league player
 Sergeant Leonard Siffleet – WWII Commando
 Harry Wilson - Rugby Union player, Queensland Reds and  Wallabies.

See also 

 Cumbo Gunnerah
 Gunnedah Shire Council

References

External links 

Visit Gunnedah
Gunnedah Shire Council
Gunnedah High School
Gunnedah -VisitNSW.com

Towns in New South Wales
North West Slopes
Populated places established in 1833
1833 establishments in Australia
Gunnedah Shire